Gareth Paul O'Connor (1978/1979 – c. May 2003) was a member of the Real IRA who was murdered in 2003.

Disappearance

O'Connor disappeared after driving through Newtownhamilton in 2003, en route to Dundalk Garda station, where he regularly reported as part of bail conditions imposed after he was charged in the Republic of Ireland with membership of the Real IRA.

In May 2003, Monsignor Denis Faul stated that he believed an armed group was involved in O'Connor's disappearance:

Discovery of body 

On 11 June 2005, O'Connor's badly decomposed body was discovered in his car in Newry Canal, County Down. His father, Mark, believes that the Provisional IRA were responsible for the murder, as they had threatened father and son. Mark O'Connor said: "I gave those names [of the killers] to Gerry Kelly [Sinn Féin assembly member]. But nothing has been done. Gerry Adams ignores us and ignores all the families of the Disappeared."

A Sinn Féin spokesperson said:

See also

Forced disappearance
Disappeared (Northern Ireland)
Independent Commission for the Location of Victims' Remains
Thomas Murphy (Irish republican)
Peter Wilson (Disappeared)
Gerard Evans
Columba McVeigh
Murder of Jean McConville
Disappearance of Peter Wilson
Robert Nairac
Internal Security Unit
List of solved missing persons cases

References

External links
Cain.ulst.ac.uk
Newrytimes.com
News.bbc.co.uk
Breakingnews.ie

1970s births
2000s missing person cases
2003 deaths
Date of birth missing
Date of death unknown
Deaths by firearm in Northern Ireland
Enforced disappearances in Northern Ireland
Kidnapped people from Northern Ireland
Missing person cases in Ireland
Murder victims from Northern Ireland
People from County Armagh
People killed by the Provisional Irish Republican Army
People murdered in Northern Ireland
Terrorism deaths in Northern Ireland
2003 murders in the United Kingdom
May 2003 events in the United Kingdom
Unsolved murders in Northern Ireland